Refinitiv is an American-British global provider of financial market data and infrastructure. The company was founded in 2018. It is a subsidiary of London Stock Exchange Group after a US$27 billion sale from previous owners Blackstone Group LP which held a 55% stake and Thomson Reuters which owned 45%. The company has an annual turnover of $6 billion with more than 40,000 client companies in 190 countries.

History
Refinitiv's predecessors include Thomson Financial.

Thomson Reuters sold a 55% majority stake in its Financial & Risk (F&R) unit to private equity firm Blackstone Group LP on October 1, 2018, in a deal which valued the total F&R business at about $20 billion. This business was formed into Refinitiv.

Under the deal, Thomson Reuters transferred its complete financial and risk product portfolio to Refinitiv, with the exception of Regulatory Intelligence, Risk Compliance Learning and Data Privacy Advisory Services. Company CEO David Craig presided over the transfer from Thomson Reuters, which he joined as Group Strategy Director in 2007. British-born Craig's previous role was a partner at US-based global management consulting firm McKinsey & Company.

In August 2019, London Stock Exchange Group (LSEG) agreed to buy Refinitiv in an all-share transaction valuing the company at $27 billion. LSEG expected to receive regulatory approval to close the transaction in the first quarter of 2021. It was finally awarded such approval by EU regulators in January 2021.

In 2019, Refinitiv spun off Tradeweb in an IPO.

In March 2020, Refintiv announced the purchase of software-as-services firm Scivantage for an undisclosed amount.

Refinitiv acquired Advisor software in July 2020 and Red Flag Group in October 2020.

Censorship in China

Under pressure from the government of China, Refinitiv censored over 200 stories by Reuters covering the 2019–20 Hong Kong protests, removing them from its Eikon platform for consumers in Mainland China. The company developed a "Strategic China filter" to block politically-sensitive stories from readers in Mainland China.

Operations

Refinitiv runs more than 130 fintech data, analytics, trading, and risk assessment tools including World-Check, a risk intelligence database for financial crime legislation compliance, FXall, Eikon, the execution management system REDI, Datastream for macro-economic analysis, Quantitative Analytics on the Cloud, AutoAudit and the Elektron Data Platform, creating 32,000 risk intelligence records every month from internal and third-party sources. Another, the World-Check Risk Intelligence database, compiles information from international financial watch lists, government records, and media searches to tackle money laundering. Refinitiv also maintains a database featuring more than a million mergers and acquisitions (M&A) deals spanning over 40 years, covering corporate finance transactions and investment banking league tables across equity markets, debt, loans, bonds, project finance, initial public offerings (IPOs), joint ventures, repurchases, private equity and municipal bonds.

Although Thomson Reuters used to be a minority shareholder in Refinitiv, it supplies Reuters news and content to the company's 400,000 plus customers in more than 40,000 businesses around the world, supported by a network of at least 13,000 registered developers.

The company's innovation group, branded as Refinitiv Labs is tasked with taking the lead in exploring new directions and creating new capabilities, derived from part of Thomson Reuters Labs, initially with sites in London, New York, Singapore, San Francisco and Cape Town (later the Cape Town site was closed and the San Francisco site moved to another part of the organization). It consists of engineering, user experience (UX)/design thinking, research, data science and management functions.

Refinitiv's Developer Portal includes data feeds, SDKs and APIs, documentation, sample code, learning materials and community Q & A forums. These run alongside "developer days" in regional centers on topics including machine learning, cloud services and relevant legislation such as GDPR.

Refinitiv is the provider of World-Check, a database of Politically Exposed Persons (PEPs) and heightened risk individuals and organizations. And is also a member of the Global Coalition to Fight Financial Crime.

See also
Other notable financial data providers include:
Bloomberg L.P.
S&P Global
FactSet
Iress

References

London Stock Exchange Group
Financial technology companies
Thomson Reuters
Financial services companies based in New York City
Financial services companies established in 2018
Companies based in Manhattan
American companies established in 2018
American subsidiaries of foreign companies
2018 establishments in New York City
2021 mergers and acquisitions